South Uptown is a residential neighborhood of Minneapolis, Minnesota. In 2018, the neighborhood voted to change its name to South Uptown from its former name CARAG (Calhoun Area Residents' Action Group). Other potential names for the neighborhood included "Bryant Park" and "Bryant Square". The Minneapolis City Council approved the name change in November 2018.

South Uptown is part of the Calhoun Isles community of the city, in the southeastern part of that community.  It is located directly south of Lowry Hill East and directly east of East Calhoun. Its boundaries are Lake Street to the north, Lyndale Avenue to the east, 36th Street to the south, and Hennepin Avenue to the west. South Uptown, Lowry Hill East, East Calhoun and East Isles form the business district of Uptown.

References

External links 
Minneapolis Neighborhood Profile - South Uptown
South Uptown Neighborhood Association

Neighborhoods in Minneapolis